Latin (  or  ) is a classical language belonging to the Italic branch of the Indo-European languages. Latin was originally a dialect spoken in the lower Tiber area (then known as Latium) around present-day Rome, but through the power of the Roman Republic it became the dominant language in the Italian region and subsequently throughout the Roman Empire. Even after the fall of Western Rome, Latin remained the common language of international communication, science, scholarship and academia in Europe until well into the 18th century, when other regional vernaculars (including its own descendants, the Romance languages) supplanted it in common academic and political usage, and it eventually became a dead language in the modern linguistic definition.

Latin is a highly inflected language, with three distinct genders (masculine, feminine, and neuter), six or seven noun cases (nominative, accusative, genitive, dative, ablative, and vocative), five declensions, four verb conjugations, six tenses (present, imperfect, future, perfect, pluperfect, and future perfect), three persons, three moods, two voices (passive and active), two or three aspects, and two numbers (singular and plural). The Latin alphabet is directly derived from the Etruscan and Greek alphabets.

By the late Roman Republic (75 BC), Old Latin had been standardized into Classical Latin used by educated elites. Vulgar Latin was the colloquial form spoken at that time among lower-class commoners and attested in inscriptions and the works of comic playwrights Plautus and Terence and author Petronius. Late Latin is the written language from the 3rd century, and its various Vulgar Latin dialects developed in the 6th to 9th centuries into the modern Romance languages. Medieval Latin was used during the Middle Ages as a literary language from the 9th century to the Renaissance, which then used Renaissance Latin. Later, New Latin evolved during the early modern era to eventually become various forms of rarely spoken Contemporary Latin, one of which, Ecclesiastical Latin, remains the official language of the Holy See and the Roman Rite of the Catholic Church at Vatican City.

Latin has also greatly influenced the English language and historically contributed many words to the English lexicon after the Christianization of Anglo-Saxons and the Norman conquest. In particular, Latin (and Ancient Greek) roots are still used in English descriptions of theology, science disciplines (especially anatomy and taxonomy), medicine, and law.

History

A number of phases of the language have been recognized, each distinguished by subtle differences in vocabulary, usage, spelling, and syntax. There are no hard and fast rules of classification; different scholars emphasize different features. As a result, the list has variants, as well as alternative names.

In addition to the historical phases, Ecclesiastical Latin refers to the styles used by the writers of the Roman Catholic Church from late antiquity onward, as well as by Protestant scholars.

After the Western Roman Empire fell in 476 and Germanic kingdoms took its place, the Germanic people adopted Latin as a language more suitable for legal and other, more formal uses.

Old Latin

The earliest known form of Latin is Old Latin, which was spoken from the Roman Kingdom to the later part of the Roman Republic period. It is attested both in inscriptions and in some of the earliest extant Latin literary works, such as the comedies of Plautus and Terence. The Latin alphabet was devised from the Etruscan alphabet. The writing later changed from what was initially either a right-to-left or a boustrophedon script to what ultimately became a strictly left-to-right script.

Classical Latin

During the late republic and into the first years of the empire, a new Classical Latin arose, a conscious creation of the orators, poets, historians and other literate men, who wrote the great works of classical literature, which were taught in grammar and rhetoric schools. Today's instructional grammars trace their roots to such schools, which served as a sort of informal language academy dedicated to maintaining and perpetuating educated speech.

Vulgar Latin

Philological analysis of Archaic Latin works, such as those of Plautus, which contain fragments of everyday speech, indicates that a spoken language, Vulgar Latin (termed , "the speech of the masses", by Cicero), existed concurrently with literate Classical Latin. The informal language was rarely written, so philologists have been left with only individual words and phrases cited by classical authors and those found as graffiti.
As it was free to develop on its own, there is no reason to suppose that the speech was uniform either diachronically or geographically. On the contrary, Romanised European populations developed their own dialects of the language, which eventually led to the differentiation of Romance languages.

The Romance languages descend from Vulgar Latin and were originally the popular and informal dialects spoken by various layers of the Latin-speaking population. These dialects were distinct from the classical form of the language spoken by the Roman upper classes, the form in which Romans generally wrote.

The decline of the Roman Empire meant a deterioration in educational standards that brought about Late Latin, a postclassical stage of the language seen in Christian writings of the time. It was more in line with everyday speech, not only because of a decline in education but also because of a desire to spread the word to the masses.

Currently, the five most widely spoken Romance languages by number of native speakers are Spanish, Portuguese, French, Italian and Romanian. Despite dialectal variation, which is found in any widespread language, the languages of Spain, France, Portugal, and Italy have retained a remarkable unity in phonological forms and developments, bolstered by the stabilising influence of their common Christian (Roman Catholic) culture. It was not until the Muslim conquest of Spain in 711, cutting off communications between the major Romance regions, that the languages began to diverge seriously. The Vulgar Latin dialect that would later become Romanian diverged somewhat more from the other varieties, as it was largely separated from the unifying influences in the western part of the Empire.

One key marker of whether a given Romance feature was found in Vulgar Latin is to compare it with its parallel in Classical Latin. If it was not preferred in Classical Latin, then it most likely came from the undocumented contemporaneous Vulgar Latin. For example, the Romance for "horse" (Italian , French , Spanish , Portuguese  and Romanian ) came from Latin . However, Classical Latin used . Therefore,  was most likely the spoken form.

Vulgar Latin began to diverge into distinct languages by the 9th century at the latest, when the earliest extant Romance writings begin to appear. They were, throughout the period, confined to everyday speech, as Medieval Latin was used for writing.

Medieval Latin

Medieval Latin is the written Latin in use during that portion of the postclassical period when no corresponding Latin vernacular existed. The spoken language had developed into the various incipient Romance languages; however, in the educated and official world, Latin continued without its natural spoken base. Moreover, this Latin spread into lands that had never spoken Latin, such as the Germanic and Slavic nations. It became useful for international communication between the member states of the Holy Roman Empire and its allies.

Medieval Latin might use  and  instead. Furthermore, the meanings of many words have been changed and new vocabularies have been introduced from the vernacular. Identifiable individual styles of classically incorrect Latin prevail.

Renaissance Latin

The Renaissance briefly reinforced the position of Latin as a spoken language by its adoption by the Renaissance Humanists. Often led by members of the clergy, they were shocked by the accelerated dismantling of the vestiges of the classical world and the rapid loss of its literature. They strove to preserve what they could and restore Latin to what it had been and introduced the practice of producing revised editions of the literary works that remained by comparing surviving manuscripts. By no later than the 15th century they had replaced Medieval Latin with versions supported by the scholars of the rising universities, who attempted, by scholarship, to discover what the classical language had been.

New Latin

During the Early Modern Age, Latin still was the most important language of culture in Europe. Therefore, until the end of the 17th century, the majority of books and almost all diplomatic documents were written in Latin. Afterwards, most diplomatic documents were written in French (a Romance language) and later native or other languages.

Contemporary Latin

Despite having no native speakers, Latin is still used for a variety of purposes in the contemporary world.

Religious use 

The largest organisation that retains Latin in official and quasi-official contexts is the Catholic Church. The Catholic Church required that Mass be carried out in Latin until the Second Vatican Council of 1962–1965, which permitted the use of the vernacular. Latin remains the language of the Roman Rite. The Tridentine Mass (also known as the Extraordinary Form or Traditional Latin Mass) is celebrated in Latin. Although the Mass of Paul VI (also known as the Ordinary Form or the Novus Ordo) is usually celebrated in the local vernacular language, it can be and often is said in Latin, in part or in whole, especially at multilingual gatherings. Vatican City is also home to the world's only automatic teller machine that gives instructions in Latin. In the pontifical universities postgraduate courses of Canon law are taught in Latin, and papers are written in the same language.

In the Anglican Church, after the publication of the Book of Common Prayer of 1559, a Latin edition was published in 1560 for use in universities such as Oxford and the leading "public schools" (English private academies), where the liturgy was still permitted to be conducted in Latin. There have been several Latin translations since, including a Latin edition of the 1979 USA Anglican Book of Common Prayer.

Use of Latin for mottos 
In the Philippines and in the Western world, many organizations, governments and schools use Latin for their mottos due to its association with formality, tradition, and the roots of Western culture.

Canada's motto  ("from sea to sea") and most provincial mottos are also in Latin. The Canadian Victoria Cross is modelled after the British Victoria Cross which has the inscription "For Valour". Because Canada is officially bilingual, the Canadian medal has replaced the English inscription with the Latin .

Spain's motto Plus ultra, meaning "even further", or figuratively "Further!", is also Latin in origin. It is taken from the personal motto of Charles V, Holy Roman Emperor and King of Spain (as Charles I), and is a reversal of the original phrase  ("No land further beyond", "No further!"). According to legend, this phrase was inscribed as a warning on the Pillars of Hercules, the rocks on both sides of the Strait of Gibraltar and the western end of the known, Mediterranean world. Charles adopted the motto following the discovery of the New World by Columbus, and it also has metaphorical suggestions of taking risks and striving for excellence.

In the United States the unofficial national motto until 1956 was E pluribus unum meaning "Out of many, one". The motto continues to be featured on the Great Seal, it also appears on the flags and seals of both houses of congress and the flags of the states of Michigan, North Dakota, New York, and Wisconsin. The mottos 13 letters symbolically represent the original Thirteen Colonies which revolted from the British Crown. The motto is featured on all presently minted coinage and has been featured in most coinage throughout the nation's history.

Several states of the United States have Latin mottos, such as:

 Arizona's  ("God enriches");
 Connecticut's  ("He who transplanted sustains"); 
 Kansas's  ("Through hardships, to the stars"); 
 Colorado's  ("Nothing without providence"); 
 Michigan's  ("If you seek a pleasant peninsula, look about you"), is based on that of Sir Christopher Wren, in St. Paul's Cathedral; 
 Missouri's  ("The health of the people should be the highest law"); 
 New York (state)'s  ("Ever upward"); 
 North Carolina's  ("To be rather than to seem"); 
 South Carolina's  ("While [still] breathing, I hope"); 
 Virginia's  ("Thus always to tyrants"); and 
 West Virginia's  ("Mountaineers [are] always free").

Many military organizations today have Latin mottos, such as:

  ("always ready"), the motto of the United States Coast Guard; 
  ("always faithful"), the motto of the United States Marine Corps; 
 Semper supra ("always above"), the motto of the United States Space Force; 
  ("Through adversity/struggle to the stars"), the motto of the Royal Air Force (RAF); and
  ("We stand on guard for thee"), the motto of the Canadian Armed Forces.

A law governing body in the Philippines have a Latin motto, such as:

  ("Justice, peace, work"), the motto of the Department of Justice (Philippines);

Veritas was the goddess of truth, a daughter of Saturn, and the mother of Virtue.

Other modern uses 
Switzerland has adopted the country's Latin short name  on coins and stamps, since there is no room to use all of the nation's four official languages.

Some films of ancient settings, such as Sebastiane and The Passion of the Christ, have been made with dialogue in Latin for the sake of realism. Occasionally, Latin dialogue is used because of its association with religion or philosophy, in such film/television series as The Exorcist and Lost ("Jughead"). Subtitles are usually shown for the benefit of those who do not understand Latin. There are also songs written with Latin lyrics. The libretto for the opera-oratorio  by Igor Stravinsky is in Latin.

The continued instruction of Latin is often seen as a highly valuable component of a liberal arts education. Latin is taught at many high schools, especially in Europe and the Americas.

 Occasionally, some media outlets, targeting enthusiasts, broadcast in Latin. Notable examples include Radio Bremen in Germany, YLE radio in Finland (the Nuntii Latini broadcast from 1989 until it was shut down in June 2019), and Vatican Radio & Television, all of which broadcast news segments and other material in Latin.

A variety of organisations, as well as informal Latin 'circuli' ('circles'), have been founded in more recent times to support the use of spoken Latin. Moreover, a number of university classics departments have begun incorporating communicative pedagogies in their Latin courses. These include the University of Kentucky, the University of Oxford and also Princeton University.

There are many websites and forums maintained in Latin by enthusiasts. The Latin Wikipedia has more than 130,000 articles.

Urdaneta City's motto  ("It is enough for the people to serve God") the Latin motto can be read in the old seal of this Philippine city.

Legacy
Italian, French, Portuguese, Spanish, Romanian, Catalan, Romansh and other Romance languages are direct descendants of Latin. There are also many Latin borrowings in English and Albanian, as well as a few in German, Dutch, Norwegian, Danish and Swedish. Latin is still spoken in Vatican City, a city-state situated in Rome that is the seat of the Catholic Church.

Inscriptions
Authors and publishers vary, but the format is about the same: volumes detailing inscriptions with a critical apparatus stating the provenance and relevant information. The reading and interpretation of these inscriptions is the subject matter of the field of epigraphy. About 270,000 inscriptions are known.

Literature

The works of several hundred ancient authors who wrote in Latin have survived in whole or in part, in substantial works or in fragments to be analyzed in philology. They are in part the subject matter of the field of classics. Their works were published in manuscript form before the invention of printing and are now published in carefully annotated printed editions, such as the Loeb Classical Library, published by Harvard University Press, or the Oxford Classical Texts, published by Oxford University Press.

Latin translations of modern literature such as: The Hobbit, Treasure Island, Robinson Crusoe, Paddington Bear, Winnie the Pooh, The Adventures of Tintin, Asterix, Harry Potter, Max and Moritz, How the Grinch Stole Christmas!, The Cat in the Hat, and a book of fairy tales, "", are intended to garner popular interest in the language. Additional resources include phrasebooks and resources for rendering everyday phrases and concepts into Latin, such as Meissner's Latin Phrasebook.

Influence on present-day languages
The Latin influence in English has been significant at all stages of its insular development. In the Middle Ages, borrowing from Latin occurred from ecclesiastical usage established by Saint Augustine of Canterbury in the 6th century or indirectly after the Norman Conquest, through the Anglo-Norman language. From the 16th to the 18th centuries, English writers cobbled together huge numbers of new words from Latin and Greek words, dubbed "inkhorn terms", as if they had spilled from a pot of ink. Many of these words were used once by the author and then forgotten, but some useful ones survived, such as 'imbibe' and 'extrapolate'. Many of the most common polysyllabic English words are of Latin origin through the medium of Old French. Romance words make respectively 59%, 20% and 14% of English, German and Dutch vocabularies. Those figures can rise dramatically when only non-compound and non-derived words are included.

The influence of Roman governance and Roman technology on the less-developed nations under Roman dominion led to the adoption of Latin phraseology in some specialized areas, such as science, technology, medicine, and law. For example, the Linnaean system of plant and animal classification was heavily influenced by Historia Naturalis, an encyclopedia of people, places, plants, animals, and things published by Pliny the Elder. Roman medicine, recorded in the works of such physicians as Galen, established that today's medical terminology would be primarily derived from Latin and Greek words, the Greek being filtered through the Latin. Roman engineering had the same effect on scientific terminology as a whole. Latin law principles have survived partly in a long list of Latin legal terms.

A few international auxiliary languages have been heavily influenced by Latin. Interlingua is sometimes considered a simplified, modern version of the language. Latino sine Flexione, popular in the early 20th century, is Latin with its inflections stripped away, among other grammatical changes.

The Logudorese dialect of the Sardinian language is the closest contemporary language to Latin.

Education

Throughout European history, an education in the classics was considered crucial for those who wished to join literate circles. This also was true in the United States where many of the nation's Founders obtained a classically-based education in grammar schools or from tutors. Admission to Harvard in the Colonial era required that the applicant "Can readily make and speak or write true Latin prose and has skill in making verse . . ." Latin Study and the classics were emphasized in American secondary schools and colleges well into the Antebellum era.

Instruction in Latin is an essential aspect. In today's world, a large number of Latin students in the US learn from Wheelock's Latin: The Classic Introductory Latin Course, Based on Ancient Authors. This book, first published in 1956, was written by Frederic M. Wheelock, who received a PhD from Harvard University. Wheelock's Latin has become the standard text for many American introductory Latin courses.

The Living Latin movement attempts to teach Latin in the same way that living languages are taught, as a means of both spoken and written communication. It is available in Vatican City and at some institutions in the US, such as the University of Kentucky and Iowa State University. The British Cambridge University Press is a major supplier of Latin textbooks for all levels, such as the Cambridge Latin Course series. It has also published a subseries of children's texts in Latin by Bell & Forte, which recounts the adventures of a mouse called Minimus.

In the United Kingdom, the Classical Association encourages the study of antiquity through various means, such as publications and grants. The University of Cambridge, the Open University, a number of prestigious independent schools, for example Eton, Harrow, Haberdashers' Aske's Boys' School, Merchant Taylors' School, and Rugby, and The Latin Programme/Via Facilis, a London-based charity, run Latin courses. In the United States and in Canada, the American Classical League supports every effort to further the study of classics. Its subsidiaries include the National Junior Classical League (with more than 50,000 members), which encourages high school students to pursue the study of Latin, and the National Senior Classical League, which encourages students to continue their study of the classics into college. The league also sponsors the National Latin Exam. Classicist Mary Beard wrote in The Times Literary Supplement in 2006 that the reason for learning Latin is because of what was written in it.

Official status
Latin was or is the official language of European states:
  – Latin was an official language in the Kingdom of Hungary from the 11th century to the mid 19th century, when Hungarian became the exclusive official language in 1844. The best known Latin language poet of Croatian-Hungarian origin was Janus Pannonius.
  – Latin was the official language of Croatian Parliament (Sabor) from the 13th to the 19th century (1847). The oldest preserved records of the parliamentary sessions – held in Zagreb, Croatia – date from 19 April 1273. An extensive Croatian Latin literature exists. Latin was used on Croatian coins on even years until 1st of January 2023. when Croatia adopted Euro as official currency.
 , Kingdom of Poland – officially recognised and widely used between the 10th and 18th centuries, commonly used in foreign relations and popular as a second language among some of the nobility.

Phonology

The ancient pronunciation of Latin has been reconstructed; among the data used for reconstruction are explicit statements about pronunciation by ancient authors, misspellings, puns, ancient etymologies, the spelling of Latin loanwords in other languages, and the historical development of Romance languages.

Consonants
The consonant phonemes of Classical Latin are as follows:

 was not native to Classical Latin. In Classical Latin poetry, the letter  between vowels always counts as two consonants for metrical purposes. The consonant ⟨b⟩ usually sounds as [b]; however, when ⟨t⟩ or ⟨s⟩ follows ⟨b⟩ then it is pronounced as in [pt] or [ps]. Further, consonants do not blend together. So, ⟨ch⟩, ⟨ph⟩, and ⟨th⟩ are all sounds that would be pronounced as [kh], [ph], and [th]. In Latin, ⟨q⟩ is always followed by the vowel ⟨u⟩. Together they make a [kʷ] sound.

In Old and Classical Latin, the Latin alphabet had no distinction between uppercase and lowercase, and the letters  did not exist. Most of the letterforms were similar to modern uppercase, as can be seen in the inscription from the Colosseum shown at the top of the article.

The spelling systems used in Latin dictionaries and modern editions of Latin texts, however, normally use  in place of Classical-era .

Some notes concerning the mapping of Latin phonemes to English graphemes are given below:

In Classical Latin, as in modern Italian, double consonant letters were pronounced as long consonant sounds distinct from short versions of the same consonants. Thus the nn in Classical Latin  "year" (and in Italian ) is pronounced as a doubled  as in English unnamed. (In English, distinctive consonant length or doubling occurs only at the boundary between two words or morphemes, as in that example.)

Vowels

Simple vowels

Classical Latin distinguished between long and short vowels. In modern texts, long vowels are often indicated by a macron , and short vowels are usually unmarked except when it is necessary to distinguish between words, when they are marked with a breve . However, they would also signify a long vowel by writing the vowel larger than other letters in a word or by repeating the vowel twice in a row. The acute accent, when it is used in modern Latin texts, indicates stress, as in Spanish, rather than length.

Long vowels in Classical Latin are, technically, pronounced as entirely different from short vowels. The difference is described in the table below:

This difference in quality is posited by W. Sidney Allen in his book Vox Latina. However, Andrea Calabrese has disputed that short vowels differed in quality from long vowels during the classical period, based in part upon the observation that in Sardinian and some Lucanian dialects, each long and short vowel pair was merged. This is distinguished from the typical Italo-Western romance vowel system in which short /i/ and /u/ merge with long /eː/ and /oː/. Thus, Latin 'siccus' becomes 'secco' in Italian and 'siccu' in Sardinian.

Diphthongs
Classical Latin had several diphthongs.

The sequences sometimes did not represent diphthongs.  and  also represented a sequence of two vowels in different syllables in   "of bronze" and   "began", and  represented sequences of two vowels or of a vowel and one of the semivowels , in   "beware!",   "whose",   "I warned",   "I released",   "I destroyed",   "his", and   "new".

Old Latin had more diphthongs, but most of them changed into long vowels in Classical Latin. The Old Latin diphthong  and the sequence  became Classical . Old Latin  and  changed to Classical , except in a few words whose  became Classical . These two developments sometimes occurred in different words from the same root: for instance, Classical  "punishment" and  "to punish". Early Old Latin  usually changed to Classical .

During the Classical Latin period this form of speaking was deliberately avoided by well-educated speakers.

Syllables 
Syllables in Latin are signified by the presence of diphthongs and vowels. The number of syllables is the same as the number of vowel sounds.

Further, if a consonant separates two vowels, it will go into the syllable of the second vowel. When there are two consonants between vowels, the last consonant will go with the second vowel. An exception occurs when a phonetic stop and liquid come together. In this situation, they are thought to be a single consonant, and as such, they will go into the syllable of the second vowel.

Length 
Syllables in Latin are considered either long or short. Within a word, a syllable may either be long by nature or long by position. A syllable is long by nature if it has a diphthong or a long vowel. On the other hand, a syllable is long by position if the vowel is followed by more than one consonant.

Stress 
There are two rules that define which syllable is stressed in the Latin language.

 In a word with only two syllables, the emphasis will be on the first syllable.
 In a word with more than two syllables, there are two cases.
 If the second-to-last syllable is long, that syllable will have stress.
 If the second-to-last syllable is not long, the syllable before that one will be stressed instead.

Orthography 

Latin was written in the Latin alphabet, derived from the Etruscan alphabet, which was in turn drawn from the Greek alphabet and ultimately the Phoenician alphabet. This alphabet has continued to be used over the centuries as the script for the Romance, Celtic, Germanic, Baltic, Finnic and many Slavic languages (Polish, Slovak, Slovene, Croatian, Bosnian, Serbian and Czech); and it has been adopted by many languages around the world, including Vietnamese, the Austronesian languages, many Turkic languages, and most languages in sub-Saharan Africa, the Americas and Oceania, making it by far the world's single most widely used writing system.

The number of letters in the Latin alphabet has varied. When it was first derived from the Etruscan alphabet, it contained only 21 letters. Later, G was added to represent , which had previously been spelled C, and Z ceased to be included in the alphabet, as the language then had no voiced alveolar fricative. The letters Y and Z were later added to represent Greek letters, upsilon and zeta respectively, in Greek loanwords.

W was created in the 11th century from VV. It represented  in Germanic languages, not Latin, which still uses V for the purpose. J was distinguished from the original I only during the late Middle Ages, as was the letter U from V. Although some Latin dictionaries use J, it is rarely used for Latin text, as it was not used in classical times, but many other languages use it.

Classical Latin did not contain sentence punctuation, letter case, or interword spacing, but apices were sometimes used to distinguish length in vowels and the interpunct was used at times to separate words. The first line of Catullus 3, originally written as

  ("Mourn, O Venuses and Cupids")
or with long I as

or with interpunct as

 

would be rendered in a modern edition as

 Lugete, o Veneres Cupidinesque

or with macrons

 Lūgēte, ō Venerēs Cupīdinēsque

or with apices

 Lúgéte, ó Venerés Cupídinésque.

The Roman cursive script is commonly found on the many wax tablets excavated at sites such as forts, an especially extensive set having been discovered at Vindolanda on Hadrian's Wall in Britain. Most notable is the fact that while most of the Vindolanda tablets show spaces between words, spaces were avoided in monumental inscriptions from that era.

Alternative scripts
Occasionally, Latin has been written in other scripts:
 The Praeneste fibula is a 7th-century BC pin with an Old Latin inscription written using the Etruscan script.
 The rear panel of the early 8th-century Franks Casket has an inscription that switches from Old English in Anglo-Saxon runes to Latin in Latin script and to Latin in runes.

Grammar

Latin is a synthetic, fusional language in the terminology of linguistic typology. In more traditional terminology, it is an inflected language, but typologists are apt to say "inflecting". Words include an objective semantic element and markers specifying the grammatical use of the word.

The grammatical function can be changed by changing the markers: the word is "inflected" to express different grammatical functions, but the semantic element usually does not change. (Inflection uses affixing and infixing. Affixing is prefixing and suffixing. Latin inflections are never prefixed.)

For example, "he (or she or it) will love", is formed from the same stem, to which a future tense marker, is suffixed, and a third person singular marker, is suffixed. There is an inherent ambiguity:  may denote more than one grammatical category: masculine, feminine, or neuter gender. A major task in understanding Latin phrases and clauses is to clarify such ambiguities by an analysis of context. All natural languages contain ambiguities of one sort or another.

The inflections express gender, number, and case in adjectives, nouns, and pronouns, a process called declension. Markers are also attached to fixed stems of verbs, to denote person, number, tense, voice, mood, and aspect, a process called conjugation. Some words are uninflected and undergo neither process, such as adverbs, prepositions, and interjections.

Nouns

A regular Latin noun belongs to one of five main declensions, a group of nouns with similar inflected forms. The declensions are identified by the genitive singular form of the noun.
 The first declension, with a predominant ending letter of a, is signified by the genitive singular ending of -ae. 
 The second declension, with a predominant ending letter of us, is signified by the genitive singular ending of -i. 
 The third declension, with a predominant ending letter of i, is signified by the genitive singular ending of -is.
 The fourth declension, with a predominant ending letter of u, is signified by the genitive singular ending of -ūs.
 The fifth declension, with a predominant ending letter of e, is signified by the genitive singular ending of -ei.

There are seven Latin noun cases, which also apply to adjectives and pronouns and mark a noun's syntactic role in the sentence by means of inflections. Thus, word order is not as important in Latin as it is in English, which is less inflected. The general structure and word order of a Latin sentence can therefore vary. The cases are as follows:

 Nominative – used when the noun is the subject or a predicate nominative. The thing or person acting: the girl ran:  or 
 Genitive – used when the noun is the possessor of or connected with an object: "the horse of the man", or "the man's horse"; in both instances, the word man would be in the genitive case when it is translated into Latin. It also indicates the partitive, in which the material is quantified: "a group of people"; "a number of gifts": people and gifts would be in the genitive case. Some nouns are genitive with special verbs and adjectives: The cup is full of wine. The master of the slave had beaten him.
 Dative – used when the noun is the indirect object of the sentence, with special verbs, with certain prepositions, and if it is used as agent, reference, or even possessor: The merchant hands the stola to the woman.
 Accusative – used when the noun is the direct object of the subject and as the object of a preposition demonstrating place to which.: The man killed the boy.
 Ablative – used when the noun demonstrates separation or movement from a source, cause, agent or instrument or when the noun is used as the object of certain prepositions; adverbial: You walked with the boy.
 Vocative – used when the noun is used in a direct address. The vocative form of a noun is often the same as the nominative, with the exception of second-declension nouns ending in -us. The -us becomes an -e in the vocative singular. If it ends in -ius (such as ), the ending is just -ī, as distinct from the nominative plural in the vocative singular: "Master!" shouted the slave.
 Locative – used to indicate a location (corresponding to the English "in" or "at"). In the singular of the first and second declensions, its form coincides with the genitive ( becomes , "in Rome"). In the plural of all declensions and the singular of the other declensions, it coincides with the ablative ( becomes , "at Athens"). In the fourth-declension word , the locative form,  ("at home") differs from the standard form of all other cases.

Latin lacks both definite and indefinite articles so  can mean either "the boy is running" or "a boy is running".

Adjectives

There are two types of regular Latin adjectives: first- and second-declension and third-declension. They are so-called because their forms are similar or identical to first- and second-declension and third-declension nouns, respectively. Latin adjectives also have comparative and superlative forms. There are also a number of Latin participles.

Latin numbers are sometimes declined as adjectives. See Numbers below.

First- and second-declension adjectives are declined like first-declension nouns for the feminine forms and like second-declension nouns for the masculine and neuter forms.

Third-declension adjectives are mostly declined like normal third-declension nouns, with a few exceptions. In the plural nominative neuter, for example, the ending is -ia ( (all, everything)), and for third-declension nouns, the plural nominative neuter ending is -a or -ia ( (heads),  (animals)) They can have one, two or three forms for the masculine, feminine, and neuter nominative singular.

Participles

Latin participles, like English participles, are formed from a verb. There are a few main types of participles: Present Active Participles, Perfect Passive Participles, Future Active Participles, and Future Passive Participles.

Prepositions
Latin sometimes uses prepositions, depending on the type of prepositional phrase being used. Most prepositions are followed by a noun in either the accusative or ablative case: "apud puerum" (with the boy), with "puerum" being the accusative form of "puer", boy, and "sine puero" (without the boy), "puero" being the ablative form of "puer". A few adpositions, however, govern a noun in the genitive (such as "gratia" and "tenus").

Verbs

A regular verb in Latin belongs to one of four main conjugations. A conjugation is "a class of verbs with similar inflected forms." The conjugations are identified by the last letter of the verb's present stem. The present stem can be found by omitting the -re (-rī in deponent verbs) ending from the present infinitive form. The infinitive of the first conjugation ends in -ā-re or -ā-ri (active and passive respectively): , "to love," , "to exhort"; of the second conjugation by -ē-re or -ē-rī: , "to warn", "to fear;" of the third conjugation by -ere, -ī: , "to lead," , "to use"; of the fourth by -ī-re, -ī-rī: , "to hear," , "to attempt". The stem categories descend from Indo-European and can therefore be compared to similar conjugations in other Indo-European languages.

Irregular verbs are verbs that do not follow the regular conjugations in the formation of the inflected form. Irregular verbs in Latin are esse, "to be"; velle, "to want"; ferre, "to carry"; edere, "to eat"; dare, "to give"; ire, "to go"; posse, "to be able"; fieri, "to happen"; and their compounds.

There are six general tenses in Latin (present, imperfect, future, perfect, pluperfect and future perfect), three moods (indicative, imperative and subjunctive, in addition to the infinitive, participle, gerund, gerundive and supine), three persons (first, second and third), two numbers (singular and plural), two voices (active and passive) and two aspects (perfective and imperfective). Verbs are described by four principal parts:

 The first principal part is the first-person singular, present tense, active voice, indicative mood form of the verb. If the verb is impersonal, the first principal part will be in the third-person singular.
 The second principal part is the present active infinitive.
 The third principal part is the first-person singular, perfect active indicative form. Like the first principal part, if the verb is impersonal, the third principal part will be in the third-person singular.
 The fourth principal part is the supine form, or alternatively, the nominative singular of the perfect passive participle form of the verb. The fourth principal part can show one gender of the participle or all three genders (-us for masculine, -a for feminine and -um for neuter) in the nominative singular. The fourth principal part will be the future participle if the verb cannot be made passive. Most modern Latin dictionaries, if they show only one gender, tend to show the masculine; but many older dictionaries instead show the neuter, as it coincides with the supine. The fourth principal part is sometimes omitted for intransitive verbs, but strictly in Latin, they can be made passive if they are used impersonally, and the supine exists for such verbs.

The six tenses of Latin are divided into two tense systems: the present system, which is made up of the present, imperfect and future tenses, and the perfect system, which is made up of the perfect, pluperfect and future perfect tenses. Each tense has a set of endings corresponding to the person, number, and voice of the subject. Subject (nominative) pronouns are generally omitted for the first (I, we) and second (you) persons except for emphasis.

The table below displays the common inflected endings for the indicative mood in the active voice in all six tenses. For the future tense, the first listed endings are for the first and second conjugations, and the second listed endings are for the third and fourth conjugations:

Deponent verbs
Some Latin verbs are deponent, causing their forms to be in the passive voice but retain an active meaning: hortor, hortārī, hortātus sum (to urge).

Vocabulary

As Latin is an Italic language, most of its vocabulary is likewise Italic, ultimately from the ancestral Proto-Indo-European language. However, because of close cultural interaction, the Romans not only adapted the Etruscan alphabet to form the Latin alphabet but also borrowed some Etruscan words into their language, including  "mask" and  "actor". Latin also included vocabulary borrowed from Oscan, another Italic language.

This Hellenisation led to the addition of "Y" and "Z" to the alphabet to represent Greek sounds. Subsequently, the Romans transplanted Greek art, medicine, science and philosophy to Italy, paying almost any price to entice Greek skilled and educated persons to Rome and sending their youth to be educated in Greece.

The specific dialects of Latin across Latin-speaking regions of the former Roman Empire after its fall were influenced by languages specific to the regions. The dialects of Latin evolved into different Romance languages.

During and after the adoption of Christianity into Roman society, Christian vocabulary became a part of the language, either from Greek or Hebrew borrowings or as Latin neologisms. Continuing into the Middle Ages, Latin incorporated many more words from surrounding languages, including Old English and other Germanic languages.

Over the ages, Latin-speaking populations produced new adjectives, nouns, and verbs by affixing or compounding meaningful segments. Often, the concatenation changed the part of speech, and nouns were produced from verb segments or verbs from nouns and adjectives.

Conversational phrases

The phrases are here written with macrons, from which it is easy to calculate where stress is placed.

  to one person /  to more than one person – hello
  to one person /  to more than one person – greetings. Note that  is a loanword from Carthaginian  and it may be spelled without the H, as in the prayer  (Hail Mary)
  to one person /  to more than one person – goodbye
  – take care
 ,  – how are you?
  – good, I'm fine
  – bad, I'm not good
  – please
  – please (idiomatic, the literal meaning is I will love you)
  – you're welcome
 Latin has no words that truly translate yes or no, so it is usual to just repeat the core point of the question (usually the verb), but one may also use the following adverbs as well:
  – not at all
 ,  – thank you very much
  – how old are you?
  – I am XX years old
  – where is the toilet?
  – do you speak ...? (singular and plural). This is then followed by an adverb of the language, some of which are listed below:
  (Latin),  (Greek),  (English),  (German),  (Italian),  (French),  (Russian),  (Spanish),  (Portuguese),  (Romanian),  (Chinese),  (Japanese),  (Hebrew),  (Arabic),  (Hindi)
  /  – I love you

Numbers

In ancient times, numbers in Latin were written only with letters. Today, the numbers can be written with the Arabic numbers as well as with Roman numerals. The numbers 1, 2 and 3 and every whole hundred from 200 to 900 are declined as nouns and adjectives, with some differences.

The numbers from 4 to 100 do not change their endings.

Example text

, also called  (The Gallic War), written by Gaius Julius Caesar, begins with the following passage:

The same text may be marked for all long vowels (before any possible elisions at word boundary) with apices over vowel letters, including customarily before "nf" and "ns" where a long vowel is automatically produced:

See also

 Accademia Vivarium Novum
 Botanical Latin
 Classical compound
 Contemporary Latin
 Greek and Latin roots in English
 Hybrid word
 International Roman Law Moot Court
 Latin grammar
 Latin mnemonics
 Latin obscenity
 Latin school
 Latino sine flexione (Latin without Inflections)
 List of Greek and Latin roots in English
 List of Latin abbreviations
 List of Latin and Greek words commonly used in systematic names
 List of Latin phrases
 List of Latin translations of modern literature
 List of Latin words with English derivatives
 List of Latinised names
 Lorem ipsum
 Romanization (cultural)
 Toponymy
 Vulgar Latin

References

Bibliography

External links

Language tools
  Searches Lewis & Short's A Latin Dictionary and Lewis's An Elementary Latin Dictionary. Online results.
  Search on line Latin-English and English-Latin dictionary with complete declension or conjugation. Online results.
  Identifies the grammatical functions of words entered. Online results.
  Identifies the grammatical functions of all the words in sentences entered, using Perseus.
  Displays complete conjugations of verbs entered in first-person present singular form.
  Displays conjugation of verbs entered in their infinitive form.
  Identifies Latin words entered. Translates English words entered.
  Combines Whittakers Words, Lewis and Short, Bennett's grammar and inflection tables in a browser addon.
 
 
 "Classical Language Toolkit " (CLTK). A Natural language processing toolkit for Python offering a variety of functionality for Latin and other classical languages.
 "Collatinus web". Online lemmatizer and morphological analysis for Latin texts.

Courses
 Latin Lessons (free online through the Linguistics Research Center at UT Austin)
 Free 47-Lesson Online Latin Course, Learnlangs
 Learn Latin  Grammar, vocabulary and audio
 Latin Links and Resources, Compiled by Fr. Gary Coulter
 
  (a course in ecclesiastical Latin).
 
 Beginners' Latin on The National Archives (United Kingdom)

Grammar and study

Phonetics

Libraries
 The latin library, ancient Latin books and writings (without translations) ordered by author
 LacusCurtius, a small collection of Greek and Roman authors along with their books and writings (original texts are in Latin and Greek, translations in English and occasionally in a few other languages are available)

Latin language news and audio
 Ephemeris, online Latin newspaper:  = news in Latin of the universe (whole world)
 Ephemeris archive, archived copy of online Latin newspaper
 Nuntii Latini, from Finnish YLE Radio 1
 Nuntii Latini, monthly review from German Radio Bremen (Bremen Zwei)
 Classics Podcasts in Latin and Ancient Greek, Haverford College
 Latinum Latin Language course and Latin Language YouTube Index

Latin language online communities 
 Grex Latine Loquentium (Flock of those Speaking Latin)
 Circulus Latinus Interretialis (Internet Latin Circle)
 Latinitas Foundation, at the Vatican
 Latin Discord Forum

Languages attested from the 7th century BC
 
 
Fusional languages
Languages of Andorra
Languages of France
Languages of Italy
Languages of Portugal
Languages of Romania
Languages of Spain
Languages of Vatican City
Languages with own distinct writing systems
Subject–object–verb languages